Garmabalah-ye Olya (also Romanized as Garmābalah-ye ‘Olyā and Garmāvaleh-ye ‘Olyā) is a village in Zagheh Rural District, Zagheh District, Khorramabad County, Lorestan Province, Iran. At the 2006 census, its population was 89, in 21 families.

References 

Towns and villages in Khorramabad County